Mychocerinus depressus is a species of beetle in the family Murmidiidae. It is found in North America.

References

Coccinelloidea
Articles created by Qbugbot
Beetles described in 1866